The Sheriff of Clark County, officially The Sheriff of the County of Clark, is the chief law enforcement officer of Clark County, Nevada. The Sheriff heads the Las Vegas Metropolitan Police Department, is elected by the citizens of Clark County, and is an independent agency with joint policing of the City of Las Vegas and of unincorporated Clark County. The sheriff is the only elected head law enforcement officer within the city and county, and, as such, is not under the direct control of the city, county, state, or federal government.

The current sheriff is Kevin McMahill, who became sheriff after Republican Joe Lombardo resigned to become Governor of Nevada.

History
The Las Vegas Metropolitan Police Department was formed on July 1, 1961, by merging the former Las Vegas Police Department with the Clark County Sheriff's Department, with the Sheriff serving as its chief. The result is that Metro polices within the city limits of Las Vegas and all unincorporated areas and towns within Clark County.

Staff
Metro has more than 5,100 members. Of these, over 2,700 are police officers of various ranks and over 750 are corrections officers of various ranks.

List of Clark County Sheriffs

Charles Corkhill, 1909–1911
Sam Gay, 1911–1917
Will Mundy, 1917 (acting)
Jay Warren Woodard, 1917 (acting)
Sam Gay, 1917–1931
Joe Keate, 1931–1936
Bill Mott, 1936–1937
Gene Ward, 1937–1943
Glen Jones, 1943–1955
Butch Leypoldt, 1955–1961
Ralph Lamb, 1961–1979 (CCSO)
John McCarthy, 1979–1983
John Moran, 1983–1995 (LVPD)
Jerry Keller, 1995–2003 (CCSO)
Bill Young, 2003–2007
Doug Gillespie, 2007–2015
Joe Lombardo, 2015–2023
Kevin McMahill, 2023–present

Notes

Government of Clark County, Nevada
Las Vegas Metropolitan Police Department
Nevada sheriffs